Kim Ho-kon (born 26 March 1951) is a South Korean football manager and former football player who played as a sweeper or right back. He was the captain of the South Korea national football team in the 1978 Asian Games where they won the gold medal. He also managed Ulsan Hyundai from 2009 to 2013, and was noted for his attractive tactics, nicknamed the "Iron mace football" by showing a mortal blow during the defensive play. In 2012, he won the 2012 AFC Champions League, and was named the Asian Coach of the Year. However, he resigned from the team after coming a close second in the 2013 K League 1.

Honours

Player
Commercial Bank of Korea
Korean President's Cup: 1970

Yonsei University
Korean National Championship runner-up: 1974

ROK Army
Korean National Championship: 1975
Korean President's Cup: 1975

South Korea U20
AFC Youth Championship runner-up: 1971

South Korea
Asian Games: 1978
AFC Asian Cup runner-up: 1972

Individual
Korean FA Best XI: 1972, 1973, 1974, 1975, 1976, 1977, 1978, 1979
Korean FA Player of the Year: 1975
Asian/Oceanian Team of the 20th Century: 1998

Manager
Ulsan Hyundai
Korean League Cup: 2011
AFC Champions League: 2012

Individual
AFC Coach of the Year: 2012

See also
 List of men's footballers with 100 or more international caps

References

External links 
 Kim Ho-kon – National Team Stats at KFA 
 
 

1951 births
Living people
South Korean footballers
South Korea international footballers
1972 AFC Asian Cup players
South Korean football managers
People from Tongyeong
South Korea national football team managers
Busan IPark managers
Ulsan Hyundai FC managers
Association football defenders
Yonsei University alumni
Footballers at the 1978 Asian Games
Medalists at the 1978 Asian Games
Asian Games medalists in football
Asian Games gold medalists for South Korea
Footballers at the 1974 Asian Games
Gimhae Kim clan
South Korean Buddhists
FIFA Century Club
Sportspeople from South Gyeongsang Province